Surfers’ Choice is the debut studio album of Dick Dale and his Del-Tones, pioneers in the surf genre. The album was released in November 1962.  The recording established the conventions of surf music and brought the concept to middle America. The album was mostly recorded live at the Rendezvous Ballroom, with overdubs added in the studio. The record was out of print for a long time. It was reissued on CD by Sundazed Records in October 2006. The album was later rereleased by Not Now Music with a bonus disc of singles as Surf Beat.

Track listing
All tracks composed by Dick Dale; except where indicated
Side one
"Surf Beat"
"Sloop John B" (Carl Sandburg, Lee Hays)
"Take It Off"
"Night Owl" (Tony Allen)
"Fanny Mae" (Buster Brown)
"Misirlou Twist" (Chaim Tauber, Fred Wise, Milton Leeds, Nicholas Roubanis)
Side two
"Peppermint Man" (Alonzo Willis)
"Surfing Drums" 
"Shake 'n' Stomp"
"Lovey Dovey" (Eddie Curtis, Nuggy)
"Death of a Gremmie"
"Let's Go Trippin'"

2006 Sundazed CD bonus tracks
"Del-Tone Rock"
"Jungle Fever" (a later version of "Surfing Drums" with jungle noises added) 
"Misirlou" (traditional)
"Eight Till Midnight"
"Lovin' on My Brain"
"A Run For Life"

2013 Not Now Music bonus disc

"Ooh-Whee Marie"
"Stop Teasin'"
"St. Louis Blues"
"Jessie Pearl"
"We'll Never Hear the End of It"
"The Fairest of Them All"
"Del-Tone Rock"
"Let's Go Trippin'"
"Shake 'N' Stomp"
"Jungle Fever"
"Misirlou"
"Eight 'Til Midnight"
"Peppermint Man"
"Surf Man"

Chart positions
Billboard Music Charts – Album
1963 Pop Albums No. 59

Billboard Music Charts – Single
1962 “Let’s Go Trippin’” Pop Singles No. 60

References

1962 debut albums
Dick Dale albums
Sundazed Records albums